Robert Cowdin (September 18, 1805 – July 9, 1874) was a businessman, a field officer in the Union Army during the American Civil War and a local politician in Massachusetts. Cowdin was colonel of the 1st Massachusetts Infantry and served in several major battles early in the war. He was appointed brigadier general of volunteers September 26, 1862 and he then commanded a brigade in the defenses of Washington until March 1863. He did not become a full brigadier general because his appointment expired by law March 4, 1862 when the U.S. Senate adjourned without confirming it. His grade reverted to colonel but after being relieved of command of the brigade, he returned home and saw no further service.

Biography
Cowdin (occasionally misspelled as Cowden or Coudin) was born in Jamaica, Vermont, the son of Angier and Abiah (Carter) Cowdin. He moved to Boston at age 20 to engage in the lumber business. He served in various organizations in the state militia from 1838 until the start of the Civil War. He also served on the Common Council of Boston for eight years, and various elected positions in the city's correctional system.

Civil War
Cowdin was colonel of the 2nd Massachusetts Militia Regiment at the start of the war, and was appointed colonel of the 1st Massachusetts Infantry on May 25, 1861. He led his regiment at the battle of Blackburn's Ford on July 18, 1861, was part of Israel B. Richardson's brigade of Daniel Tyler's Division at the First Battle of Bull Run, where his horse was killed. He also saw action at Williamsburg, Fair Oaks, Glendale, Malvern Hill and Chantilly.

On September 26, 1862, based on a recommendation by General Joseph Hooker, he was appointed Brigadier General of Volunteers, and commanded the 1st Brigade, Abercrombie's Division, Defenses of Washington (later called the XXII Corps), from October 1862 to February 1863, then the 2nd Brigade until the end of March. On March 4, Congress adjourned without approving his commission, and he was relieved of duty on March 30, and returned to Massachusetts.

Postwar life
During the next 11 years, Cowdin served 10 terms on the Common Council and Board of Aldermen in Boston, and served as Captain of the Ancient and Honorable Artillery Company of Massachusetts. He died in Boston, Massachusetts, and is buried in Mount Auburn Cemetery, Cambridge, Massachusetts.

See also

List of American Civil War generals (Union)
List of Massachusetts generals in the American Civil War
Massachusetts in the American Civil War

Notes

References
 Boatner, Mark M., The Civil War Dictionary, New York: Vintage Books, 1991, p. 205.
 Dean, Dudley, editor, 'Officers of our Union army and navy : their lives, their portraits ..., Boston: L. Prang & Co., 1862; modern reprint from UMI microfilm.
 Eicher, John H., and David J. Eicher, Civil War High Commands. Stanford: Stanford University Press, 2001. .
 Warner, Ezra J., Generals In Blue: Lives of the Union Commanders, Baton Rouge: Louisiana State University Press, 1964, 1992, pp. 96–97.

Further reading
Cowdin, Robert. "Gen. Cowdin and the First Massachusetts Regiment of Volunteers." Boston: J. E. Farwell and Co., printers, 1864.

External links
 
 
 
 

1805 births
1874 deaths
People from Jamaica, Vermont
Union Army generals
People of Massachusetts in the American Civil War
People of Vermont in the American Civil War
Boston City Council members
Boston Board of Aldermen members
Burials at Mount Auburn Cemetery
19th-century American politicians